The Nine is an American serial drama television series that aired on ABC from October 4, 2006 to August 8, 2007, for one season. The series was created by Hank Steinberg and produced by Warner Bros. Television.

Plot 
Nine people, mostly strangers to each other, are linked together when they are held hostage in a bank robbery gone wrong. In each episode, viewers learn new details of the 52-hour standoff, of which only brief snippets are seen.

The pilot episode establishes the events which the rest of the series will embellish. Two men enter the bank, armed, and quickly restrain both the security guard and an off-duty police officer. Viewers see details of what brought each person to the bank that day.

Some time after the end of the standoff, the former hostages arrange a meeting with one another in an effort to stay in touch and help each other. Various characters also form relationships apart from the group and maintain regular contact with each other during the week, while others are connected through relationships that predate the events in the bank.

Cast and characters

Main
 Lourdes Benedicto as Eva Rios, a teller in the bank that is robbed and a single mother. Eva is injured during the standoff and dies shortly thereafter. Eva is Franny's sister.
 John Billingsley as Egan Foote, a data processor. Egan begins the series severely depressed and suicidal.  He is in the bank the day of the robbery to kill himself in the bathroom. After the standoff, he is hailed as a hero and feels that he has a "new lease on life".
 Jessica Collins as Elizabeth "Lizzie" Miller, a social worker. Lizzie is in a serious relationship with Jeremy at the beginning of the series. She finds out she is pregnant before walking into the bank.
 Tim Daly as Nick Cavanaugh, a police officer who happens to be a customer in the bank during the robbery. Nick has a gambling problem. Just prior to the robbery, Nick and Eva arranged to go out on a date.
 Dana Davis as Felicia Jones, a high-school student and daughter of Malcolm. Felicia is in the bank when the robbery occurs. After the standoff, she develops amnesia and cannot remember anything from the event.
 Camille Guaty as Francesca "Franny" Rios, a bank teller and Eva's sister.
 Chi McBride as Malcolm Jones, the bank manager and Felicia's father.
 Kim Raver as Kathryn Hale, an Assistant District Attorney. Kathryn is in the bank with her mother at the time of the robbery; her mother is set free.  Kathryn's boyfriend proposes after the robbery. She accepts but has a connection with Nick.
 Scott Wolf as Jeremy Kates, a cardiothoracic surgeon.  Jeremy is in a serious relationship with Lizzie at the start of the series.
 Owain Yeoman as Lucas Dalton, one of the two bank robbers. His brother is the other robber. Lucas seems to have a strange connection to Felicia.
 Jeffrey Pierce as Randall Reese, Lucas's brother and colleague during the bank robbery.

Recurring

 Tom Verica as Ed Nielson: Kathryn's colleague and boyfriend.
 Michael Emanuel as Tom Mitchell: security guard at the bank who is killed during the robbery.
 Kim Staunton as Naomi Jones: Malcolm's wife and Felicia's mother.
 Susan Sullivan as Nancy Hale: Kathryn's mother who is released from the bank during the robbery.
 Eric Lively as Brad
 Hunter Clary as Ricky Rios: Eva's son and Franny's nephew.
 April Grace as Andrea Williams: Kathryn's campaign leader when she is running for D.A.
 Jamie McShane as Henry Vartak: Nick's colleague with whom he has a rather unpleasant working relationship.
 Lillian Hurst as Consuela Hernandez: Eva and Franny's grandmother who has raised both of them.

Guest stars
 Veronica Cartwright as Barbara Dalton: Lucas and Randall's mother.
 Bonita Friedericy as Mary Foote: Egan's wife.
 JoBeth Williams as Sheryl Kates: Jeremy's mother
 Corey Stoll as Alex Kent

Broadcast
The show premiered on October 4, 2006, on ABC, in the 10 o'clock (Eastern Standard Time zone) slot after Lost. In Canada, the series debuted on CTV on October 10. In the UK, the show was picked up by Five; it was due to begin airing in 2007. However, it was not actually shown by that network until July 2008, when it began airing on Five's sister channel, Five US.

In late November 2006, ABC took The Nine off its schedule. In March 2007, ABC announced that while the rest of the 13-episode season might be aired over the following month, the show had been officially canceled due to poor ratings and there would be no second season. On May 15, 2007, the series was officially cancelled by ABC.

ABC later revived The Nine beginning Wednesday, August 1, 2007. After the first two showings set record ratings lows, the final run of The Nine was dropped by ABC – along with The Knights of Prosperity – to make room for According to Jim, Primetime: The Outsiders and NASCAR in Primetime on Wednesdays.  On August 16, 2007, the network announced that the remaining episodes would be released on ABC.com and would be available until September 24, 2007.

In March 2009, DirecTV announced a deal made with Warner Bros. to show all episodes of the series on its The 101 Network channel, beginning May 27, 2009.

Episodes

Awards
The list of awards and nominations for The Nine:

Motion picture sound editors
 2007: Best Sound Editing in Television: Short Form – Dialogue and Automated Dialogue Replacement (nominated)
 1 nomination

References

External links
 
 ReturningOnDirectTV

2000s American crime drama television series
2006 American television series debuts
2007 American television series endings
American Broadcasting Company original programming
English-language television shows
Serial drama television series
Television series by Warner Bros. Television Studios